Dprabak is a village in the Chambarak Municipality of the Gegharkunik Province of Armenia. In 1988-1989 Armenian refugees from Azerbaijan settled in the village.

History 
The village was founded in 1778 by emigrants from Artsvashen and Karabakh.

Gallery

References

External links 

 
 

Populated places in Gegharkunik Province
Populated places established in 1778
1778 establishments in Iran